Johnny Fotu Ngauamo, was born on 20 July 1969 in Nuku'alofa, Tonga.  He received his secondary education  at Marcellin College, Auckland. He is a Rugby Union international player who played for Tonga in the position of centre (1.85 metres and 96 kg).

His brother Milton was also an international rugby player.

Career

Clubs
 Harlequins 1997-1998
 ASM Clermont  1999-2003

International
He gained his first international cap for Tonga on 14 June 2003 in a match against Ireland and he played for Tonga four other times in that year.

Griffith University Colleges Knights
As of 2019 Johnny has signed on as head coach for the Knights in the Gold Coast District Rugby Union competition. He is looking to lead the 1st XV to back to back premierships for the first time in club history. 2019, Ngauamao's first in charge was a successful year finishing Minor Premiers at the end of the regular season, unfortunately falling to Helensvale Hogs in the Grand Final. 2020 was an exceptional year for Ngauamo and the Knights going undefeated throughout the whole season. The Grand Final saw the Knights defeat Nerang Bulls 34-12 in the final.

External 
 Scrum Statistics (Retrieved 25 March 2015)

Tongan rugby union players
People educated at Marcellin College, Auckland
People from Nukuʻalofa
Tonga international rugby union players
1969 births
Living people
Rugby union centres